"I Sing the Body Electric" is episode 100 of the American television anthology series The Twilight Zone. The 1962 script was written by Ray Bradbury, and became the basis for his 1969 short story of the same name, itself named after an 1855 Walt Whitman poem. Although Bradbury contributed several scripts to The Twilight Zone, this was the only one produced.

Opening narration

Plot
Mr. Rogers, the widowed father of three children (Anne, Karen, and Tom), is dealing with the departure of Aunt Nedra, who says the children are too hard to manage. The father takes the kids to a factory, Facsimile Ltd., to select a new robotic grandmother. When she arrives, young Tom and Karen quickly are smitten by the magical "grandmother." But older daughter Anne will not accept her; "Grandma" reminds her too much of her own mother, who died and left her a bitter young girl. Anne tries to run away, and runs into the path of an oncoming van which she doesn't see. Grandma pushes Anne out of the way and is struck, saving the girl. Grandma is stunned, but the sturdily constructed robot soon gets up, and Anne grows to love her when she realizes that Grandma is indestructible and will not leave them like their own mother had. Mr. Rogers also realizes how empathetic Grandma can be when she correctly deduces that he lost his own mother at a young age and, like Anne, never forgave her.

The children grow up and are ready for college. However, it is time for Grandma to move on to another family as she is apparently not needed anymore. Grandma expresses her sadness about leaving, yet reassures the kids that they brought her just as much joy as she brought them. She will return to the factory where she will either be sent to another family, or possibly have her mind stored where she and the other grandmothers like her can talk and share their experiences.  After repeating this process many times, if she keeps being a good grandmother to other children, she ultimately will be rewarded with the gift of life and humanity. The kids say their farewells, and Grandma leaves the house for good.

Closing narration

Cast
 Josephine Hutchinson as Grandma
 David White as Mr Rogers
 Vaughn Taylor as Salesman
 Doris Packer as Nedra
 Veronica Cartwright as Anne (age 11)
 Susan Crane as Anne (age 19)
 Charles Herbert as Tom (age 12)
 Paul Nesbitt as Tom (age 20)
 Dana Dillaway as Karen (age 10)
 Judee Morton as Karen (age 18)

Narration
In addition to opening and closing the show as usual, Rod Serling's narration occurs in the middle of the story, to describe how the children spent years happily with their Gynoid grandmother and eventually grow up. Other episodes to feature mid-show narration from Serling are all from the first half of season one: "Walking Distance", "Time Enough At Last" and "I Shot an Arrow into the Air".

This is one of the few episodes of the series where Rod Serling does not mention the name of the show in the closing narration.

Other adaptations
In 1982, the hour-long NBC television movie The Electric Grandmother was also based on the short story.

It was also adapted for radio in 2011 in The Twilight Zone Radio Dramas by Falcon Picture Group and starred Dee Wallace.

References

Footnotes

Bibliography
 DeVoe, Bill. (2008). Trivia from The Twilight Zone. Albany, GA: Bear Manor Media. 
 Grams, Martin. (2008). The Twilight Zone: Unlocking the Door to a Television Classic. Churchville, MD: OTR Publishing.

External links
 

1962 American television episodes
The Twilight Zone (1959 TV series season 3) episodes
Television episodes about robots
Adaptations of works by Ray Bradbury